The Bude Canal was a canal built to serve the hilly hinterland in the Cornwall and Devon border territory in the United Kingdom, chiefly to bring lime-bearing sand for agricultural fertiliser. The Bude Canal system was one of the most unusual in Britain.

It was remarkable in using inclined planes to haul tub boats on wheels to the upper levels. There were only two conventional locks, in the short broad canal section near the sea at Bude itself.

The design of the canal influenced the design of the Rolle Canal.

Origins
The coastal area at Bude has sand unusually rich in minerals, and the poor agricultural land of the locality was found to benefit considerably from application of the sand. In the pre-industrial age, actually transporting it was difficult, even to land relatively close to the coast.

Several schemes were put forward for canals to bring the sand to the countryside, and these proposals did not lack ambition. One early scheme, conceived by Cornish engineer John Edyvean, aimed at distributing Welsh coal from the port as far inland as Calstock on the River Tamar. It gained parliamentary approval for construction in 1774, but financial problems and the Napoleonic Wars frustrated the proposal.

In 1818, the West Country canal engineer James Green produced a report for canal's backers, and an Act of Parliament was obtained for this more moderate proposal in 1819. After some difficulties in the construction phase, the canal was completed, and opened on 8 July 1823. Its cost was £118,000.

The canal system
The project:
 improved the difficult exposed sea harbour at Bude;
 built a reservoir at Virworthy to feed water to the system.

The main line of the canal ran south east from Bude to Druxton Wharf near Launceston, with an easterly branch to Blagdonmoor, beyond Holsworthy. There was a northerly feeder arm leading from a new reservoir at Virworthy, now called Lower Tamar Lake.

The tub boats were designed to use the main part of the system, and they generally made the transit from the harbour at Bude, or from Helebridge if trans-shipping from coastal vessels there.

The main line to Druxton Wharf, near Launceston, negotiated three descending inclined planes as it followed the southerly course of the River Tamar.

With no intermediate locks on the tub boat sections, the canal had to follow the contours between the inclined planes, and this made its route even more circuitous than most canals. However, some relatively ambitious viaducts and earthworks were constructed, particularly where side streams and small valleys entered the main watercourse and its valley.

The inclined planes

The unusual feature of the canal was the six inclined planes. The tub boats had wheels, and on the inclined planes they were pulled up the slopes with the wheels running in channel rails (like a squat letter "U" in section). There were two sets of rails, one for each direction, but it does not appear that a counterbalancing system was used (in which a boat coming down would balance one being pulled up).

The tub boats were hauled up and let down the inclined planes by chains, which were operated in most cases by waterwheels; the transit took five minutes or so. There were standby steam engines at some of the inclined planes. However the Hobbacott Inclined Plane (both the steepest and that allowing the greatest height difference) used a different system of harnessing water power: water filled a very large bucket, and it was simply the weight of the water that pulled the ascending tub boat up the incline. The bucket operated in a deep vertical shaft, and at the bottom a plug was opened and the water ran to waste along an adit which connected to the lower level of the canal; the descending bucket pulled an empty bucket up in the same operation. The full bucket had to be heavy enough to pull a loaded tub boat up the 1 in 4 gradient as well as overcoming friction, and Green calculated that a weight of about fifteen tons was necessary. This was successful, and the bucket raised a boat up the plane in about four minutes, which was about one half of the time taken when the  standby steam engine was used.

The gradients of the planes differed somewhat, with Hobbacott being the steepest at 1 in 4.5 and Vealand being the gentlest at 1 in 8.6.

Tub boats
They were commonly operated by coupling between 4 and 6 together and hauling them – by horse power – together. Steering was possible by manually altering the connection between adjacent boats, using handspikes.

Each boat had four wheels  in diameter for running on the inclined planes; the boats were hauled up and down individually.

The operation of lining the tub boats up with the rails, at transfer from canal to plane, must have been difficult. Once engaged with the continuous chain, it would have been impracticable to stop the motion momentarily while the wheels were guided to the rail channels; but no record is available as to how this was achieved.

Operation

On completion of the canal, the owning company was constantly short of cash, and inevitably income did not reach the levels predicted at the stage of promoting the canal. In addition, serious problems with the state of the newly finished works were discovered, although in the circumstances of a locally promoted scheme with novel technological aspects, the canal as built was better engineered than it might have been. The chains on the inclined planes were constantly breaking, the rails broke, and other mechanical failures were frequent, and physical damage from careless boat handling was also common.

However, the rich sand was successfully carried to farms near the various wharves in large quantities, and other merchandise was also carried, particularly coal from South Wales. Traffic picked up in the 1880s, and when the London and South Western Railway reached Holsworthy, the canal carried significant volumes of the sand to Stanbury Wharf for onward conveyance by railway; the mile or so between the wharf and the railway station must have been negotiated by horse and cart.

Nonetheless, the arrival of the railway soon spelt the ultimate doom of the canal: manufactured fertilisers had become commonplace and cheap, and they could be brought in by railway, so that the demand for the local sand was diminished considerably.

When it became obvious that the canal could not survive, some directors proposed obtaining parliamentary authority for abandonment, or selling the canal outright to the railway company, or anyone else. However, legal conditions agreed at the time of construction gave certain landowners rights to take water from the canal, and they would not give up these rights without compensation, so for the time being the proposals for disposal were frustrated. Finally, abandonment of the tub boat operation took place on 14 November 1891, with the Launceston main line and the Holsworthy branch being abandoned, but the Feeder arm continuing to be kept open because of the water rights. After protracted negotiations, the remainder of the canal was bought by Stratton and Bude Urban District Council, on 1 January 1902, and this enabled them to supply domestic water in due course to the villages in the district from the canal's Tamar reservoir. The works became the responsibility of North Cornwall District Council  when English local government was reorganised in 1974.

The canal today

Today the sea lock is still in working order, and the canal is 'in water' as far as the base of the first inclined plane. The sea lock, though, is the only lock on this section still in working order, so that navigation is not possible along the whole network. Much of the upper section has been ploughed over or has become overgrown, but it is possible to see many remaining signs of the canal's presence, in bridges and wharf buildings. On the feeder branch and on the lower part of the Launceston main line, the alignment is indicated on current Ordnance Survey maps. In most cases, the alignment is not open to the public, however.

An exhaustive list of locations where the canal's remains can be seen may be found in Harris and Ellis.

Plans for restoration

In 2005 major plans were approved to re-develop the canal, including renewal of the two locks between the sea lock and the first inclined plane. £3.8 million in funding for this project was provided by the Heritage Lottery Fund, Objective One and the South West Regional Development Agency. Most of the planned projects were completed by 31 March 2009, which was also the date on which North Cornwall District Council ceased to exist: the partners in the project expressed the hope that the new Unitary Authority would complete the three unfinished elements: raising Rodd's bridge, providing slipways at each end of the canal, and re-connecting it to Helebridge Wharf.

One element of the restoration was a number of wooden sculptures by Daniel Sodhi-Miles. These are inscribed with Cornish words and phrases, and take the form of chains or parts of chains, recalling the canal's boating history.

March 2008 damage 
On Monday 10 March 2008, a powerful storm wrenched one of the lock gates off its fixings. Contractors removed the gate the following morning, and four-tonne concrete pipes were placed in the canal basin to dissipate the power of waves coming in from the sea. A temporary dam was constructed at Falcon Bridge, and a team of anglers and staff from the Environment Agency rescued the fish population before it was swept out to sea.

The North Cornwall District Council used the opportunity to repair the canal walls and dredge the basin. It was originally intended to refill the basin gradually after 8 July 2008, but a period of intense rainfall prior to that date resulted in a surge of water passing down the canal, which damaged the coffer dam protecting the empty section from the watered section. Consequently, the basin refilled in a single day.

Route coordinates

Main line Bude to Launceston

Holsworthy Branch

Feeder from Lower Tamar Lake

Route details extracted from 1885 OS maps.

See also

Canals of the United Kingdom
History of the British canal system
 List of reservoirs and dams in the United Kingdom

Bibliography

References

External links

Bude Canal & Harbour Society
Bude Canal Trust
Description and photos of the Planekeepers Path from Cann Orchard to Thurlibeer (Hobbacott) Incline
images & interactive map of mile markers seen along the Bude canal

Canals in Cornwall
Canals opened in 1823
Industrial archaeological sites in Cornwall
Industrial archaeological sites in Devon
Works of James Green
Bude